Mary Miles Minter (born Juliet Reilly; April 25, 1902– August 4, 1984) was an American actress. She appeared in 53 silent films from 1912 to 1923.

In 1922, Minter was involved in a scandal surrounding the murder of director William Desmond Taylor, for whom she professed her love. Although gossip implicated her mother, former actress Charlotte Shelby, as the murderer, Minter's reputation was tarnished, and she gave up her film career in 1923.

Early life
Minter was born in Shreveport, Louisiana, the younger of two daughters born to J. Homer Reilly (1877–1958) and Lily Pearl Miles (later known as Broadway actress Charlotte Shelby; 1877–1957). Her sister was Margaret Reilly, who later became an actress using the name Margaret Shelby.

Career

Stage and film career

At the age of five, she accompanied her sister Margaret on an audition because no babysitter was available. She was noticed by the director and given her first part. She began her stage career and frequently was employed afterward, widely noted for both her talent and visual appeal. To avoid child labor laws while the 10-year-old was appearing in a play in Chicago in 1912, Charlotte Shelby obtained the birth certification of her older sister's deceased daughter from Louisiana, and Juliet became Mary Miles Minter.

In her screen debut, in which she was billed as Juliet Shelby, she appeared in the 1-reel short film The Nurse (1912). Her new stage name was applied, and Minter starred in the role as Viola Drayton, the fairy, in the 5-reel drama The Fairy and the Waif (1915).

Minter's career steadily grew after that. She specialized in playing demure young women. With her photogenic features, blue eyes, and blonde curls, she emulated and later rivaled Mary Pickford.

Her first movie for director William Desmond Taylor was Anne of Green Gables (1919). It was well-received, and Taylor actively promoted Minter. According to Minter, a romantic relationship developed between them. However, Minter (who had grown up fatherless) said Taylor had reservations from the outset and later curtailed the romance, citing their 30-year age difference.  Other people who knew Taylor and Minter said he never reciprocated her feelings.

Scandal
On February 1, 1922, Taylor was murdered in his home, a two-story bungalow apartment on Alvarado Street, at the southeast corner of Alvarado and Maryland Street in the Westlake area of Los Angeles.

The ensuing scandal, following the Roscoe "Fatty" Arbuckle scandal of Labor Day weekend 1921, and Arbuckle's murder trial, was the subject of widespread media speculation and embellishment. Newspapers reported that coded love letters written by Minter had been found in his bungalow after his death (these were later shown to have been written three years earlier in 1919). Minter was at the height of her success, having starred in more than 50 films, and newspaper revelations of the 20-year-old star's association with the 49-year-old murdered director was cause for a sensational scandal.

There were several suspects (including her mother Charlotte Shelby) in the long investigation of Taylor's murder. In 1937, Minter publicly announced to the Los Angeles Examiner newspaper: "Now I demand that I either be prosecuted for the murder committed fifteen years ago, or exonerated completely. If the District Attorney has any evidence, he should prosecute. If not, then I should be exonerated... Shadows have been cast upon my reputation." Taylor's murder was never solved.

In a 1970 interview, during which she described Taylor as her "mate," Minter recalled going to view Taylor's body immediately after the murder. In shock, she demanded to be used for a blood transfusion to revive him, not believing he was dead until she touched his body in the morgue: "That deadly cold... convinced me as nothing else could have done. No life can return to this man." She broke down and sobbed: "They crucified Jesus. Now they've crucified... They've crucified my mate."

Later career and retirement
Minter made four more motion pictures for Paramount, with her last being The Trail of the Lonesome Pine (1923). When the studio did not renew her contract, she received many other offers but declined them all, saying she had never been happy as an actress.

Personal life

Minter was involved with James Kirkwood Sr. for a time in 1916 when she was 15 years old. Minter and Kirkwood "married" without benefit of clergy in the countryside near Santa Barbara. The relationship ended after Minter became pregnant by Kirkwood and underwent an abortion, which was paid for by her mother.

In late 1922, several months after Taylor's death, Minter became involved romantically for a time with then-news correspondent of Los Angeles and movie critic Louis Sherwin, who had at one time been married to actress Maude Fealy.

In 1925, Minter sued her mother for an accounting of the money Shelby had received for her during her screen career. The case was settled out of court, with the settlement being signed by Minter and Shelby at the American consulate in Paris, France, on January 24, 1927.

In 1934, a hearing took place in Los Angeles, in which Hilda Desey, the proprietor of a dress shop on Wilshire Blvd., claimed that Minter entered her shop and took a tweed dress valued at $55.00 by force. Minter countered in court by stating that she had helped finance Miss Desey's dress shop and that she took the dress as she was owed interest. The deputy district attorney declined to issue a complaint for either petty theft or malicious mischief, as it was decided that there was no evidence of malicious intent on the part of Minter.

In 1957, Minter and real estate developer Brandon O. Hildebrandt (1898–1965) were married. They remained married until Hildebrandt's death in 1965.

Later years
Minter commented she was content to live without her Hollywood career. She later reconciled with her mother and proclaimed her love for Taylor throughout her life. Minter's money had been invested in Los Angeles real estate, and she seems to have lived in relative comfort and prosperity. She later moved to a house in Santa Monica, California; her mother Charlotte Shelby died there in 1957.

In 1981, Minter was severely beaten in a burglary at her home in which more than $300,000 worth of antiques, china and jewelry were taken. A former live-in companion and three other people were charged with attempted murder and burglary. The police described her as a frail old woman, and people often were shocked to learn she had been a famous movie star.

Minter died in 1984 at age 82 from a stroke in Santa Monica. She was cremated, and her ashes were scattered at sea. For her contribution to movies, she has a star on the Hollywood Walk of Fame at 1724 Vine Street in Hollywood.

Legacy
Much of Minter's work has been lost; of her 53 films, approximately a dozen are known to exist today. A print of her 1919 movie The Ghost of Rosy Taylor surfaced in New Zealand in the 1990s. Other known surviving movies include The Fairy and the Waif (1915), Youth's Endearing Charm (1916), A Dream or Two Ago (1916), The Innocence of Lizette (1916), The Eyes of Julia Deep (1918), Nurse Marjorie (1920), A Cumberland Romance (1920) and The Little Clown (1921).

Filmography

References

External links

 
 
 Mary-Miles-Minter.com 

1902 births
1984 deaths
Actresses from Louisiana
American child actresses
American film actresses
American stage actresses
American silent film actresses
Actors from Shreveport, Louisiana
Actresses from Los Angeles
Actresses from Santa Monica, California
Paramount Pictures contract players
20th-century American actresses